Diana Rast (born 28 August 1970) is a Swiss former racing cyclist. She was the Swiss National Road Race champion in 2000. She also competed at the 1996 Summer Olympics.

References

External links

1970 births
Living people
Swiss female cyclists
Place of birth missing (living people)
Cyclists at the 1996 Summer Olympics
Olympic cyclists of Switzerland
21st-century Swiss women